Çandarlı is a coastal township with own municipality within the district of Dikili in western Turkey's İzmir Province. It is a well-developed town and an important tourist resort. It is a fishing village, were a lot of daily life revolves around such, with many people having jobs surrounding the fishing industry, making nets, gutting and cooking the fish, not to forget the fisherman themselves. It has a small population in winter months of approximately 1000, but in summer the population nearly doubles with tourists - going all the way to about 2000, normally domestic tourists rather than international. Çandarlı is situated on the northern coast of the (Gulf of Çandarlı) and opposite the important industrial center of Aliağa, another district center.

The town's landmark is the 15th century Ottoman castle rebuilt by the Grand Vizier Çandarlı Halil Pasha the Younger. The castle, built to protect Sultan Murat II who preferred to reside in nearby Manisa from a possible outside attack, is fully intact and open to visitors.

Çandarlı Halil Pasha the Younger also gave the town its present name, naming it after his own family. Çandarlı's name in antiquity was Pitane. The ruins are situated slightly outside the town itself.

See also
 Çandarlı family
 Çandar

Populated places in İzmir Province
İzmir
Seaside resorts in Turkey
Fishing communities in Turkey
Towns in Turkey